Joseph McDonnell may refer to:

 Joseph Myles McDonnell (died 1872), Irish Repeal Association politician
 Joseph Patrick McDonnell (1846–1906), Irish-American labor leader and journalist

See also
 Joe McDonnell (disambiguation)